Markos Dounis (born 9 May 1992) is a Greek professional footballer who plays as a forward for Super League 2 club Asteras Vlachioti.

Career
He started his career at the youth teams of Panionios and was promoted to the first team on 8 July 2007.

AEK Athens
Before the end of the 2013–14 season Dounis agreed to join AEK Athens on a three-year contract, which was made effective on 1 July 2014. He made his debut on 29 August in 4–0 home win Fokikos for the Greek Cup. On 17 December 2014 he scored his first goal in a comfortable 4–0 win against Fostiras. Despite the three-year duration of his contract, he was released on 11 September 2015, as he wasn't part of the team's plans.

Aris
On 16 September 2015 he signed for Aris. At the end of the season he celebrated promotion to the Football League. On 30 August 2016, he extended his contract for two seasons. On 12 February 2017, he scored once and was sent-off in a dramatic 2–2 away draw against Apollon Smyrni.

On 25 November 2017, he scored one goal and had one assist in a dramatic 3–2 away win against Ergotelis, after a catastrophic first half, which found his team being down by two goals. On 7 January 2018, he sealed a 2–0 home win against Apollon Pontou. One week later he opened the score in a 2–0 away win against Apollon Larissa. On 18 March 2018, Dounis came in as a substitute and scored a crucial 88th-minute equalizer with his first ever free-kick goal in a 1–1 away draw against Panachaiki. At the end of the season he celebrated promotion to the Superleague, before leaving the club, following the expiration of his contract.

Iraklis
On 17 August 2018, he moved to Iraklis on a two-year deal. On 2 December 2018, he scored his first goal for the club in a 3–0 away win against Aittitos Spata.

Personal life
His favorite football player is Cristiano Ronaldo and one day he wants to play with him in the same team.

Honours
AEK Athens
Football League: 2014–15 (South Group)

References

External links
Insports profile 

1992 births
Living people
Super League Greece players
Panionios F.C. players
AEK Athens F.C. players
Aris Thessaloniki F.C. players
Iraklis Thessaloniki F.C. players
Olympiacos Volos F.C. players
Trikala F.C. players
Pierikos F.C. players
Association football forwards
Footballers from Athens
Greek footballers
Asteras Vlachioti F.C. players